The 2021 Collegiate Rugby Championship was a college rugby sevens tournament played from May 29–31, 2021 at Gold Mine on Airline in New Orleans, Louisiana. The tournament is also known as May Madness. It was the eleventh annual Collegiate Rugby Championship, and the first year that the tournament was held in New Orleans.  The men's competition consisted of 28 teams while the women's competition contained 12 teams. All teams compete in a single elimination bracket. Lindenwood are the two-time defending champions. All matches played in the stadium were broadcast on The Rugby Network and on the National Collegiate Rugby YouTube channel. Lindenwood won the women's competition, beating Life in the final, 10–7. Likewise, Lindenwood beat Life, 24–14 in the men's final to claim their third consecutive title. Teams which were knocked out of the Premier Cup Bracket, competed in the Champion Plate, Challenge Bowl, and the Survivor Shield. Wheeling won the Champion Plate, Central College won the Challenge Bowl, and Mckendree won the Survivor Shield.

Premier Cup Bracket

Final Four

Players

Most Valuable Player
Evan Williams

Men's All Tournament Team
Lucas Pattison (Army West Point)
Marnus Spangenburg (Lindenwood University)
Joey Backe (Western Michigan University)
Chase Schor-Haskin (Life University)
Owen Kennedy (Christendom College)
Ishma-Eel Safodien (Life University)
George Phelan (Life University)
Evan Williams (Lindenwood University)
Ryan Johnstone (Air Force Academy)
Nolan Green (Army West Point)
Donovan Law (Life University)
Andre Greenup (McKendree University)

References

2021
2021 rugby union tournaments for clubs
2021 in American rugby union
2021 rugby sevens competitions
2021 in sports in Louisiana
Collegiate Rugby